The gens (plural gentes) was a Roman family, of Italic or Etruscan origins, consisting of all those individuals who shared the same nomen and claimed descent from a common ancestor.  It was an important social and legal structure in early Roman history.

Every member of a gens, whether by birth or adoption, bore this name. All nomina were based on other nouns, such as personal names, occupations, physical characteristics or behaviors, or locations. Consequently, most of them ended with the adjectival termination -ius (-ia in the feminine form).

Faliscan gentes frequently had nomina ending in -ios, while Samnite and other Oscan-speaking peoples of southern Italy had nomina ending in -iis. Umbrian nomina typically end in -as, -anas, -enas, or -inas, while nomina ending in -arna, -erna, -ena, -enna, -ina, or -inna are characteristic of Etruscan families.

The word gens is feminine, and the name of a gens was also feminine.  Marcus Valerius Corvus was a member of gens Valeria.  Valerius was his nomen.  His son's nomen would have been Valerius, and his daughter's Valeria.  Male members of his gens were collectively called Valerii, and female members Valeriae.  If a member of the gens were adopted into another family, he would assume the nomen of that gens, followed by the cognomen Valerianus.

In the following list, "I" and "J" are treated as separate letters, as are "U" and "V".  The letter "K" was rare in Latin, and the few nomina occasionally spelled with this letter were usually spelled with "C".  No Roman gentes began with "X", and the letters "Y" and "Z" occurred only in names borrowed from Greek.  The letter "W" did not exist in Classical Latin.

A

 Abronia
 Abudia
 Aburia
 Accia
 Accoleia
 Acerronia
 Acilia
 Aconia
 Actoria
 Acutia
 Aebutia
 Aedinia
 Aelia
 Aemilia
 Afinia
 Afrania
 Agoria
 Albania
 Albatia
 Albia
 Albinia
 Albinovana
 Albucia
 Alfena
 Alfia
 Alfidia
 Allectia
 Alliena
 Amafinia
 Amatia
 Ambrosia
 Ampia
 Ampudia
 Ancharia
 Anicia
 Annaea
 Anneia
 Annia
 Anquirinnia
 Antia
 Antistia
 Antonia
 Apisia
 Aponia
 Appia
 Appuleia
 Apronia
 Apustia
 Aquillia
 Aquinia
 Arellia
 Arennia
 Arminia
 Arpineia
 Arrecina
 Arria
 Arruntia
 Articuleia
 Artoria
 Asconia
 Asellia
 Asinia
 Ateia
 Aternia
 Atia
 Atilia
 Atinia
 Atria
 Attia
 Audasia
 Aufeia
 Aufidia
 Aulia
 Aurelia
 Auria
 Aurunculeia
 Ausonia
 Autronia
 Avia
 Aviana
 Avidia
 Aviena
 Avilia
 Axia

B

 Babria
 Baebia
 Balonia
 Balventia
 Bantia
 Barbatia
 Barria
 Bavia
 Bellia
 Bellicia
 Belliena
 Betiliena
 Betitia
 Betua
 Betucia
 Blandia
 Blossia
 Boionia
 Bruttia
 Bucculeia
 Burbuleia
 Burriena

C

 Caecia
 Caecilia
 Caecinia
 Caedicia
 Caelia
 Caeparia
 Caepasia
 Caerellia
 Caesellia
 Caesennia
 Caesetia
 Caesia
 Caesonia
 Caesulena
 Caetronia
 Calavia
 Calesterna
 Calidia
 Calpurnia
 Calventia
 Calvisia
 Campatia
 Cania
 Canidia
 Caninia
 Cantia
 Cantilia
 Canuleia
 Canutia
 Carfulena
 Caria
 Carisia
 Caristania
 Carpinatia
 Carrinatia
 Carteia
 Carvilia
 Casperia
 Cassia
 Castricia
 Castrinia
 Catia
 Catiena
 Catilia
 Ceionia
 Centenia
 Ceppuleia
 Cervonia
 Cestia
 Cicereia
 Cilnia
 Cincia
 Cispia
 Classidia
 Claudia
 Cloelia
 Cluentia
 Clutoria
 Cluvia
 Cocceia
 Coelia
 Cominia
 Condetia
 Consentia
 Consia
 Considia
 Coponia
 Cordia
 Corfidia
 Cornelia
 Cornificia
 Coruncania
 Cosconia
 Cossinia
 Cossutia
 Cotia
 Cottia
 Crassicia
 Cremutia
 Crepereia
 Critonia
 Cupiennia
 Curia
 Curiatia
 Curtia
 Curtilia
 Cusinia
 Cuspia

D

 Decia
 Decidia
 Decimia
 Dellia
 Desticia
 Dexsia
 Didia
 Digitia
 Dillia
 Domitia
 Duccia
 Duilia
 Durmia
 Duronia

E

 Eggia
 Egilia
 Egnatia
 Egnatuleia
 Egrilia
 Elvia
 Ennia
 Epidia
 Eppia
 Equitia
 Erucia

F

 Fabia
 Fabricia
 Fadena
 Fadia
 Faenia
 Falcidia
 Faleria
 Faminia
 Fannia
 Farsuleia
 Faucia
 Favonia
 Festinia
 Fidiculania
 Firmia
 Flaminia
 Flavia
 Flavinia
 Flavoleia
 Flavonia
 Floria
 Floridia
 Floronia
 Fonteia
 Foslia
 Fufia
 Fuficia
 Fufidia
 Fulcinia
 Fulginatia 
 Fulvia
 Fundania
 Furia
 Furnia

G

 Gabinia
 Galeria
 Gallia
 Gargonia
 Gavia
 Gegania
 Gellia
 Geminia
 Genucia
 Gessia
 Glicia
 Grania
 Gratidia
 Gratia

H

 Hateria
 Heia
 Helvia
 Helvidia
 Herennia
 Herennuleia
 Herminia
 Hirria
 Hirtia
 Hirtuleia
 Horatia
 Hordeonia
 Hortensia
 Hosidia
 Hostia
 Hostilia

I

 Iallia
 Iasdia
 Iccia
 Icilia
 Ignia
 Insteia
 Istacidia
 Iteia
 Ituria

J

 Jania
 Javolena
 Jucundia
 Julia
 Juncia
 Junia
 Justia
 Justinia
 Juventia

L

 Laberia
 Labiena
 Laceria
 Laecania
 Laelia
 Laenia
 Laetilia
 Laetoria
 Lafrenia
 Lamponia
 Laronia
 Lartia
 Latinia
 Lavinia
 Lemonia
 Lentidia
 Lepidia
 Libertia
 Liburnia
 Licinia
 Ligaria
 Livia
 Livinia
 Lollia
 Longinia
 Loreia
 Lucceia
 Lucia
 Luciena
 Lucilia
 Lucretia
 Luria
 Luscia
 Lusia
 Lutatia

M

 Maccia
 Macrinia
 Maecenatia 
 Maecia
 Maecilia
 Maelia
 Maenatia 
 Maenia
 Maevia
 Magia
 Mallia
 Mamercia
 Mamilia
 Manilia
 Manlia
 Marcia
 Maria
 Martinia
 Matia
 Matiena
 Matinia
 Matrinia
 Maximia
 Memmia
 Menenia
 Menia
 Mescinia
 Messia
 Messiena
 Mestria
 Metilia
 Mettia
 Milonia
 Mimesia
 Minatia
 Minia
 Minicia
 Minidia
 Minucia
 Modia
 Mucia
 Mummia
 Munatia
 Munia
 Murria
 Mussidia
 Mustia
 Mutia
 Mutilia

N

 Naevia
 Nasennia
 Nasidia
 Nasidiena
 Nautia
 Neratia
 Nerfinia
 Neria
 Nicomachi
 Nigidia
 Ninnia
 Nipia
 Nonia
 Norbana
 Novellia
 Novia
 Numeria
 Numicia
 Numisia
 Numitoria
 Nummia
 Numonia
 Nunnuleia
 Nymphidia

O

 Obellia
 Obultronia
 Occia
 Oclatia
 Oclatinia
 Ocratia
 Octavena
 Octavia
 Ofania
 Ofilia
 Ogulnia
 Ollia
 Opellia
 Opetreia
 Opimia
 Opiternia
 Oppia
 Oppidia
 Opsia
 Opsidia
 Opsilia
 Orania
 Orbia
 Orbicia
 Orbilia
 Orchia
 Orcivia
 Orfia
 Orfidia
 Oscia
 Ostoria
 Otacilia
 Ovidia
 Ovinia

P

 Paccia
 Pacidia
 Pacilia
 Paconia
 Pactumeia
 Pacuvia
 Palfuria
 Palpellia
 Pantuleia
 Papia
 Papinia
 Papiria
 Pasidia
 Pasidiena
 Passiena
 Patulcia
 Pedania
 Pedia
 Peducaea
 Peltrasia
 Percennia
 Perpernia
 Persia
 Pescennia
 Petillia
 Petreia
 Petronia
 Petrosidia
 Pilia
 Pinaria
 Pinnia
 Pisentia
 Placidia
 Plaetoria
 Plaguleia
 Plancia
 Plaria
 Plautia
 Pleminia
 Plinia
 Poetelia
 Pollia
 Pompeia
 Pompilia
 Pomponia
 Pomptina
 Pontia
 Pontidia
 Pontilia
 Pontiliena
 Popillia
 Popaedia
 Popidia
 Poppaea
 Porcia
 Postumia
 Postumulena
 Potitia
 Praecilia
 Praeconia
 Prastinia 
 Precia
 Priscia
 Procilia
 Proculeia
 Propertia
 Publicia
 Publilia
 Pupia

Q

 Quartia
 Quartinia
 Quinctia
 Quinctilia
 Quirinia

R

 Rabiria
 Rabonia
 Rabuleia
 Racilia
 Raecia
 Ragonia
 Rammia
 Rania
 Rasinia
 Reginia
 Remmia
 Rennia
 Resia
 Romania
 Romilia
 Roscia
 Rubellia
 Rubrena
 Rubria
 Rufia
 Rufinia
 Rufria
 Rullia
 Rupilia
 Rusonia
 Rustia
 Rusticelia
 Rutilia

S

 Sabellia
 Sabidia
 Sabinia
 Sabucia
 Saenia
 Safinia
 Saliena
 Sallustia
 Salonia
 Saltia
 Saltoria
 Salvia
 Salvidia
 Salvidiena
 Salviena
 Sammia
 Sanquinia
 Saria
 Sariolena
 Satellia
 Satria
 Satriena
 Sattia
 Saturia
 Saufeia
 Scaevia
 Scaevinia
 Scandilia
 Scantia
 Scantinia
 Scaptia
 Scoedia
 Scribonia
 Scutaria
 Seccia
 Secundia
 Secundinia
 Sedatia
 Segulia
 Seia
 Selicia
 Sellia
 Sempronia
 Sennia
 Sentia
 Seppia
 Seppiena
 Septicia
 Septimia
 Septimuleia
 Septueia
 Sepullia
 Sepunia
 Sergia
 Seria
 Sertoria
 Servaea
 Servenia
 Servia
 Servilia
 Sestia
 Severia
 Sextia
 Sextilia
 Sibidiena
 Sicinia
 Silia
 Silicia
 Silvia
 Simplicia
 Simplicinia
 Sinicia
 Sinnia
 Sittia
 Socellia
 Sollia
 Sornatia
 Sosia
 Sotidia
 Spedia
 Spellia
 Splattia
 Spuria
 Spurilia
 Spurinnia
 Staberia
 Staia
 Stallia
 Statia
 Statilia
 Statinia
 Statoria
 Steia
 Stellia
 Stenia
 Stertinia
 Stlaccia
 Strabonia
 Subria
 Suedia
 Suellia
 Suetonia
 Suettia
 Suilia
 Sulpicia
 Surdinia
 Symmachi

T

 Tadia
 Talia
 Tampia
 Tanicia
 Tannonia
 Tanusia
 Tapsennia
 Taracia
 Taria
 Tariolena
 Taronia
 Tarpeia
 Tarquinia
 Tarquitia
 Tarrutenia
 Tarutia
 Tarutilia
 Tatia
 Tattia
 Tauria
 Tebana
 Tedius
 Teia
 Terentia
 Terentilia
 Tertia
 Tertinia
 Tetrinia
 Tettia
 Tettidia
 Tettiena
 Thorania
 Thoria
 Tiburtia
 Ticinia
 Tifernia
 Tigellia
 Tigidia
 Tillia
 Tineia
 Titania
 Titedia
 Titia
 Titinia
 Tittia
 Titucia
 Titulena
 Tituria
 Titurnia
 Traia
 Traula
 Trausia
 Travia
 Trebania
 Trebatia
 Trebellia
 Trebelliena
 Trebia
 Trebicia
 Trebonia
 Trebulana
 Tremellia
 Triaria
 Triccia
 Truttedia
 Tuccia
 Tudicia
 Tullia
 Turbonia
 Turcia
 Turia
 Turpilia
 Turrania
 Turselia
 Tursidia
 Turullia
 Tuscenia
 Tuscilia
 Tussania
 Tussidia
 Tutia
 Tuticana
 Tuticia
 Tutilia
 Tutinia
 Tutoria

U

 Ulpia
 Umbilia
 Umbonia
 Umbrena
 Umbria
 Umbricia
 Ummidia
 Urbania
 Urbicia
 Urbinia
 Urgulania
 Urseia
 Urvinia
 Utilia

V

 Valeria
 Varena
 Varia
 Varinia
 Varisidia
 Vatinia
 Vecilia
 Vedia
 Velia
 Velleia
 Venafrania
 Ventidia
 Venuleia
 Vequasia
 Verania
 Verecundia
 Vergilia
 Verginia
 Verres
 Verria
 Vesnia
 Vesonia
 Vestoria
 Vestricia
 Vetilia
 Vettia
 Veturia
 Vibenia
 Vibia
 Vibidia
 Vibullia
 Viciria
 Victoria
 Victorinia
 Victricia
 Viducia
 Vigilia
 Villia
 Vinia
 Vinicia
 Vipsania
 Vipstana
 Viria
 Viridia
 Visellia
 Vistilia
 Vitellia
 Vitrasia
 Vitruvia
 Voconia
 Volcacia
 Volturcia
 Volumnia
 Volusena
 Volusenna
 Volusia
 Vorenia
 Vulia

See also
Roman naming conventions
List of Roman nomina
List of Roman cognomina
Roman gentes of Etruscan origin
Roman gentes of Hernician origin
Roman gentes of Latin origin from Alba Longa
Roman gentes of Latin origin from Praeneste
Roman gentes of Latin origin from Tibur
Roman gentes of Latin origin from Tusculum
Roman gentes of Picentine origin
Roman gentes of Sabine origin
Roman gentes of Samnite origin
Roman gentes of Umbrian origin
Roman gentes of Volscian origin
 Prosopography of ancient Rome

References

Gentes
Lists of ancient Indo-European peoples and tribes